BLADE Network Technologies, based in Santa Clara, California, was a supplier of Ethernet network switches for blade servers and server and storage data center racks.
BLADE became part of IBM System Networking in 2010. Later sold to Lenovo as part of purchase of IBM x86 server division

History 
On February 13, 2006, Garnett & Helfrich Capital 
established  BLADE Network Technologies, Inc., as a privately held company from a spin-out of Nortel's Blade Server Switch Unit,  focused on networking for the blade server market.
Vikram Mehta was president and CEO.

In 2008, the company introduced its RackSwitch line of top-of-rack 1-10 Gigabit Ethernet data center switches. IBM acquired BLADE in October 2010.
Lenovo acquired IBM's server business, including BLADE in 2014.

See also 
 Fibre Channel over Ethernet
 IBM BladeCenter
 List of mergers and acquisitions by IBM

References

External links
 Lenovo System Networking

IBM acquisitions
Electronics companies established in 2006
Companies based in Santa Clara, California
Networking companies of the United States
Networking hardware companies
2006 establishments in California
2010 mergers and acquisitions
Electronics companies disestablished in 2010
2010 disestablishments in California